The Santa Rosa County Library System is the primary provider of library services in Santa Rosa County, Florida. It is publicly funded and operated by Santa Rosa County.

In 2020, the Director of Library Services, the official responsible for the management of the agency, was Gwen Wilson. The budget of the agency for 2020 was $1,829,970.

Branches 

 Milton Library (Main Branch; Milton)
 The Genealogy Center (Milton)
 Navarre Library (Navarre)
 Gulf Breeze Library (Gulf Breeze)
 Jay Library (Jay)
 Pace Library (Pace)

References

External links 
Santa Rosa County Website
Santa Rosa County Library System Catalog Website

Navarre, Florida
County library systems in Florida
2006 establishments in Florida
Libraries established in 2006